"The Miracle of Peckham" is an episode of the BBC sitcom, Only Fools and Horses. It was the second episode of series 5, and was first broadcast on 7 September 1986. In the episode, Del witnesses a miracle at his local church, which creates a media frenzy.

Synopsis
While Rodney worries about what a muscular man named Biffo is going to do to him for drunkenly stealing his trumpet the previous night (to make matters worse, Albert has subsequently thrown the trumpet down the rubbish chute), Del Boy goes to church to seek forgiveness for some stolen goods he has recently purchased. The parish priest explains to Del how the local hospice is facing closure. They then witness an apparent miracle: a statue of the Virgin Mary on the altar appears to be weeping. Del instantly senses an opportunity to make money and save the hospice, and tells Rodney to alert the media. Within days, reporters and camera crews from all over the world are in Peckham to cover the story. Del presents himself as a modern-day prophet, predicting when the statue will weep again.

After several more miracles, enough money is raised to save the local hospice. It then suddenly dawns on the priest that the "miracles" always occur when it is raining. Upon inspecting the church's roof, he finds that all of the lead tiles are missing. Only then does it emerge that those lead tiles were the stolen goods Del had sought forgiveness for, but he points out that the money raised from the resulting "miracles" did save the local hospice. The priest, much to Del's surprise, blesses him for doing so.

As they exit the church, Del and Rodney shake hands with the many reporters and camera crews, until Rodney finds out that he is shaking the hand of Biffo, who demands to know where his trumpet is. Rodney tries talking his way out of it, but then runs away with Biffo giving chase. Del senses an opportunity to make some more money from this, and offers the nearby reporters and camera crews a chance to film some "authentic inner city violence".

Episode cast

Episode concept
The idea for the script goes all the way back five years earlier to "The Second Time Around", where Grandad told Rodney about how Del used to donate to the church roof fund.

Music
 Carl Orff: "O Fortuna" from Carmina Burana

Note: In the VHS/DVD versions, Carl Orff's "O Fortuna" is replaced by a similar-sounding piece of music.

References

External links

1986 British television episodes
Only Fools and Horses (series 5) episodes